Nikam is a last name found in Hindu Maratha, Kunbi, and Bhil communities of Maharashtra. They were known as Nikumbh Rajputs. The Kunbi Nikams are often called Maratha traders or Kunams or Kunbi vanis.

Notable people:
Yesaji Kank

Raja Allashakti Nikumbha ( Nikam )

Sardar Vajoji Nikam, was Sardar of Chhatrapati Shahu I of Satara.

Sardar Subhanji Nikam, was Sardar of Chhatrapati Shahu I of Satara.

See also 
 Marathi people

References

Further reading 

Surnames